Navan Hibernians is a now-defunct Gaelic Athletic Association hurling club that was based in Navan, in County Meath, Ireland.

Honours

Navan Hibernians won the inaugural Meath Senior Hurling Championship in 1902.

External links
 Navan Hibernians GAA Club

References

Gaelic games clubs in County Meath